Woodruff is an unincorporated community in Platte County, in the U.S. state of Missouri. It is part of the Kansas City metropolitan area.

History
A post office called Woodruff was established in 1891, and remained in operation until 1924. The community has the name of Charles Woodruff, a personal acquaintance of a railroad employee.

References

Unincorporated communities in Platte County, Missouri
Unincorporated communities in Missouri